Emily's First 100 Days of School is a children's book written and illustrated by Rosemary Wells. Published by Hyperion Books in 2000, it is about a young rabbit who learns the numbers 1 to 1 Hundred in many different ways, starting with the number 1 for the First Day of School.

Reception
Kirkus Reviews wrote: "Wells (Yoko, 1998, etc.) makes numbers fun and relevant to daily life in this longer than usual picture book."

Film adaptation
A thirty-six-minute animated film based on the book was released in 2006. Directed by Gene Deitch, it was produced by JZ Media and Weston Woods Studios, Inc.

References

2000 children's books
American picture books
Schools in fiction
Books about rabbits and hares